Home Free is the debut album by American singer-songwriter Dan Fogelberg, released in 1972. Upon its original release, Home Free had lukewarm success, but following a later reissue, it was certified platinum by the RIAA for certified sales of 1,000,000 copies.

Track listing

Personnel
 Dan Fogelberg – vocals, acoustic and electric guitars, acoustic piano, organ, Moog synthesizer
 David Briggs – acoustic piano on "More than Ever" and "Anyway I Love You", organ on "Long Way Home"
Kenneth A. Buttrey – drums, percussion
The Goodlettesville String Quartet – strings on "Long Way Home"
Farrell Morris – percussion, vibraphone
 Weldon Myrick  – dobro, pedal steel guitar
 Bill Pursell – string arrangements on "Hickory Grove"
 Norbert Putnam – bass guitar, cello
 Buddy Spicher – fiddle, viola
 Glen Spreen – string arrangements on "To the Morning" and "Wysteria"

Production
 Producer – Norbert Putnam
 Engineers – Gene Eichelberger and Lee Hazen
 Recorded at Quadraphonic Sound Studio (Nashville, TN).
 Photography – Kenneth A. Buttrey
 Cover Portrait – Dan Fogelberg

Charts
Album – Billboard (United States)

References

Dan Fogelberg albums
1972 debut albums
Albums produced by Norbert Putnam
Epic Records albums